Armageddon Massive is the debut full-length album from Californian ska band The Dingees. The album's sound moves between punk and ska, and its lyrics focus on the frustrations of life.

Track listing
 "Ghetto Box Smash"
 "Chaos Control"
 "Bullet Proof"
 "Could Be Worse"
 "Workin' Man's Blues"
 "Rebel Youth"
 "Betrayal"
 "Deadman"
 "Carry On With The Countdown"
 "Another Burnin' City"
 "Escape To L.A."
 Dub version of "Could Be Worse" (hidden track) starts at 4:20

Music Credits
Pegleg - Throat
Bean Hernandez - Bass
Jeff Holmes - Geetar
Ethan Luck - Drums

Guest musicians
David Ralicke - Trombone, Bari Sax
Efren Santana - Tenor Sax
Kincaid Smith - Trumpet
Ronnie King - Keys

References

The Dingees albums
1998 debut albums
Tooth & Nail Records albums